The Prince Who Was a Thief is a 1951 American adventure film directed by Rudolph Mate and starring Tony Curtis and Piper Laurie. A technicolor swashbuckler, it was the first film Curtis featured in as a star. It was produced and distributed by Universal Pictures.

Plot
In historic Tangiers, an assassin (Everett Sloane) is sent to kill a baby prince, but cannot go through with it. He decides to raise the child as his own, and he grows up to be a thief (Tony Curtis).

Apocryphal line
Life magazine attributed the apocryphal line, "Yonduh lies de castle of de caliph, my fadder" to Curtis in this film.

Cast
 Tony Curtis as Julna
 Piper Laurie as Tina
 Everett Sloane as Yussef
 Jeff Corey as Mokar
 Betty Garde as Mirza
 Marvin Miller as Hakar
 Peggie Castle as Princess Yasmin
 Donald Randolph as Mustapha
 Nita Bieber as Cahuena
 Milada Mladova as Dancer
 Hayden Rorke as Basra
 Midge Ware as Sari
 Carol Varga as Beulah

References

External links
 
 
 

1951 films
American swashbuckler films
1951 adventure films
Films set in Tangier
Films set in the 8th century
Universal Pictures films
Films scored by Hans J. Salter
American adventure films
1950s English-language films
1950s American films